Gerrit Wiebe Bijlsma (17 November 1929 – 13 August 2004) was a Dutch water polo player. He was part of the Dutch teams that won the European title in 1950 and placed fifth at the 1952 Summer Olympics.

References

1929 births
2004 deaths
Dutch male water polo players
Olympic water polo players of the Netherlands
Water polo players at the 1952 Summer Olympics
Sportspeople from Bandung
20th-century Dutch people